Dildora Nozimova (born 3 November 1997) is an Uzbekistani footballer who plays as a midfielder for Women's Championship club Metallurg and the Uzbekistan women's national team.

International goals

See also
List of Uzbekistan women's international footballers

References 

1997 births
Living people
Women's association football midfielders
Uzbekistani women's footballers
People from Namangan Region
Uzbekistan women's international footballers
Uzbekistani women's futsal players
20th-century Uzbekistani women
21st-century Uzbekistani women